Andrew Douglas Millar Cotter (born 20 July 1973) is a Scottish sports broadcaster working primarily for the BBC, covering mainly golf and rugby union, but also tennis, athletics and The Boat Race.

Personal life
Cotter is from Troon in Ayrshire and has a degree in French and Philosophy from the University of Glasgow. He played golf for Scottish Schools and Scottish Universities. He now lives in Cheshire.

Cotter owns two Labrador dogs: Olive and Mabel. Videos of Cotter commentating on his dogs went viral in 2020, during the COVID-19 pandemic.

Career

Radio
Cotter started his broadcasting career at Scot FM, a commercial radio station based in Edinburgh, in 1997. In 2000 he moved to London to work at both BBC Radio 5 Live and Sky News. It was at BBC Radio that he began his commentary career, in both rugby and golf covering The Six Nations and Rugby World Cup as well as the Masters Tournament, The Open Championship, the U.S. Open, the PGA Championship and the Ryder Cup. At the same time he was presenting sports bulletins across BBC Radio.

Television
Cotter's work in television began in 2001, presenting sports bulletins on BBC News 24. In 2003 he began commentating on golf for BBC Television, covering the Masters Tournament and The Open Championship, as well as other events on the European Tour. That year he also began commentating on rugby union for BBC Sport, primarily covering the Six Nations Championship.

In 2008, he began commentating on tennis and is a regular voice at The Championships, Wimbledon on The BBC.

Since 2013, Cotter has been part of BBC Sport's commentary team for athletics, working on several European Athletics and World Athletics Championships, as well as The Olympic Games. He has attended four Olympics, initially as a multi-sport commentator, but since 2016 as part of the athletics team and also as commentator on The Opening and Closing ceremonies.

Cotter took over as lead commentator on The Boat Race, when it returned to BBC from ITV in 2011.

Former BBC positions
 2000–2004: Commentator on BBC Radio 5 Live covering golf and rugby union
 2001–2006: Sports presenter on BBC News 24 and BBC World.
 2008: Commentated on 2008 Summer Olympic Games for BBC covering weightlifting and modern pentathlon.
 2011: Main BBC Commentator on the 2011 Australian Open tennis
 2012: London 2012 Summer Olympics, commentating on tennis and canoeing/kayaking events.
 2016 Rio Olympics covering the athletics 2016 Summer Olympics and Opening Ceremony in Rio de Janeiro, Brazil
 2021 Tokyo Olympics covering the athletics 2020 Summer Olympics and Opening Ceremony in Tokyo, Japan

Current BBC positions
 2002–present: Ryder Cup for Radio 5 Live
 2004–present: rugby union commentator for TV on six Nations and Autumn Internationals
 2004–present: TV golf commentator on Open, Masters, Ryder Cup & Women's Open
 2008–present: TV tennis commentator for Wimbledon, AEGON Championships at Queen's Club and AEGON International at Eastbourne
 2010–present: Boat Race commentator on television (replaced by Jonathan Legard in 2012 and 2015 as the Boat Race clashed with the US Masters Golf)
 2013–present: Athletics on TV including at the 2014 Commonwealth Games in Glasgow

Freelance work
 2011: ESPN Rugby 
 2012: wheelchair rugby for Channel 4 Paralympic Coverage
 2010–2014: Sky Sports Red Button commentary of the Heineken Cup
 2014–present: Pool Stage commentator for BT Sport European Rugby Champions Cup & European Rugby Challenge Cup
 2020–present: Olive and Mabel videos on social media and YouTube

Publications
Olive, Mabel & Me: Life and Adventures with Two Very Good Dogs. Edinburgh: Black & White, 2020. .
Dog Days: A Year with Olive & Mabel. Edinburgh: Black & White, 2021. .

References

1973 births
Living people
BBC sports presenters and reporters
Golf writers and broadcasters
Scottish rugby union commentators
Scottish sports broadcasters
Tennis commentators